The North Columbus Commercial Historic District is a historic district in the Old North Columbus neighborhood of Columbus, Ohio. It was listed on the National Register of Historic Places in 2010. The district is centered on High Street, one of the city's two main thoroughfares. The district has 25 buildings, all of which contribute to the district, and built from c. 1880 to 1960. Architectural styles range from Italianate to Tudor Revival and Neoclassical, with some Craftsman elements and one Modernist building.

See also
 National Register of Historic Places listings in Columbus, Ohio

References

External links
 

National Register of Historic Places in Columbus, Ohio
Historic districts on the National Register of Historic Places in Ohio
2010 establishments in Ohio
Historic districts in Columbus, Ohio
Old North Columbus